Compound spirit of ether, also called Hoffmann's anodyne, Hoffmann's drops, or aetheris spiritus compositus, is a solution of one part diethyl ether in three parts alcohol. It is used traditionally as an anodyne or as a hypnotic. Its use as a drug was introduced by Friedrich Hoffmann.

References

Traditional medicine